Charles Wagener House is a historic home located at Penn Yan in Yates County, New York. It is a Greek Revival style structure built about 1838.

It was listed on the National Register of Historic Places in 1994.

References

Houses on the National Register of Historic Places in New York (state)
Houses in Yates County, New York
National Register of Historic Places in Yates County, New York